Kanaka Creek is a tributary of the Fraser River, in the Canadian province of British Columbia. It flows through Maple Ridge, a district municipality at the eastern edge of Metro Vancouver.

The creek's name is reflected in the name of the local community of Kanaka Creek.  Creek and community both were named for a settlement of Kanakas (Hawaiian natives) in the employ of the Hudson's Bay Company (HBC), known as Kanakas. The HBC trading post of Fort Langley was located just across the Fraser River from Kanaka Creek. Originally Fort Langley was a few kilometres downriver, at what is now Derby. The mouth of Kanaka Creek is between the old and new sites of Fort Langley.

Course
Kanaka Creek originates near Blue Mountain, between Alouette Lake and Stave Lake. It flows south, then west to the Fraser River, which it joins between Haney and Albion. The lower half of the creek is within Kanaka Creek Regional Park.

See also
 List of tributaries of the Fraser River

References

External links
  Kanaka Creek Park, Blue Mountain Forest, Maple Ridge, BC
 Kanaka Creek Park
 Cliff Falls Hike in Kanaka Creek Park

Maple Ridge, British Columbia
Rivers of the Lower Mainland
Tributaries of the Fraser River
New Westminster Land District